João Neiva is a municipality located in the Brazilian state of Espírito Santo. Its population was 16,722 (2020) and its area is 273 km².

References

Joao Neiva